All Star Chicago Blues Session is a compilation album by blues musician Phil Guy. It contains the full session that was recorded at the Soto Sound Studio in March 1982.

Background and recordings 
Phil Guy and his brother Buddy Guy recorded a bunch of songs at the Soto Sound Studio in Chicago in March 1982. These tracks were separately released on Phil Guy’s albums, The Red Hot Blues of Phil Guy in 1982 and Bad Luck Boy in 1983. “All Star Chicago Blues Session” is a combination of these two vinyls. The original tracks are remixed.

Track listing 
 "Breakin' Out On Top" – 7:26
 "Texas Flood" – 5:46
 "Blues With A Feeling" – 6:22
 "Red Dress" – 4:11
 "Ice Around My Heart" – 8:55
 "Bad Luck Boy" – 9:11
 "Wine Head Woman" – 3:53*
 "Skin & Bones / Money" – 8:25
 "Love Is Like Quicksand" – 5:04
 "Garbage Man Blues” – 4:42

Note
Track 5 was titled “Cold Feeling”, track 7 titled "Winehead" on the original vinyl.

Personnel 
 Phil Guy – guitar, vocals
 Buddy Guy – guitar
 Doug Williams – guitar
 Professor Eddie Lusk – keyboards
 J. W. Williams – bass
 Ray Allison – drums
 Maurice John Vaughn – saxophone (tracks 1, 3, 5–8)
 Larry Cox – harmonica (tracks 3, 4)

References 

1994 compilation albums
JSP Records albums